was a Japanese chemist mainly known for the claimed discovery of element 43 (later known as technetium), which he named nipponium. The Japanese nuclear chemist Kenji Yoshihara claims that Ogawa in fact discovered, but misidentified, element 75 (later called rhenium), but chemist and philosopher of science Eric Scerri considers the evidence insufficiently conclusive.

After graduating from the University of Tokyo, he studied under William Ramsay in London, where he worked on the analysis of the rare mineral thorianite. He extracted and isolated a small amount of an apparently unknown substance from the mineral, which he announced as the discovery of element 43, naming the newly discovered element nipponium. He published his results in 1909 and a notice was also published in the Journal of the American Chemical Society. For this work, he was awarded a doctorate and the highest prize of the Tokyo Chemical Society. However, no other researchers were able to replicate his discovery, and the announcement was forgotten.

Ogawa served as president of Tohoku University between 1919 and 1928. While the name nipponium could not be reused for another element, element 113 was also discovered by a team of Japanese scientists and is now named nihonium, also after Japan. The name was chosen in respectful homage to Ogawa's work.

References

20th-century Japanese chemists
1865 births
1930 deaths
Discoverers of chemical elements
Tohoku University
19th-century Japanese people
20th-century Japanese people
Rhenium
19th-century Japanese scientists
20th-century Japanese scientists